Broadway Commons, better known by its former name Broadway Mall, is a large shopping mall located in Hicksville, New York, United States. Originally an open-air shopping center called the Mid-Island Shopping Plaza, Broadway Mall is currently a regional enclosed shopping center comprising 98 stores, as well as a food court and movie theater. The mall's anchor stores are IKEA, Target and Blink Fitness.

History

The Mid Island Shopping Plaza held its Grand Opening on October 25, 1956, on the site of a former boys' orphanage and a dairy and vegetable farm operated by the Catholic Church. It cost $40 million to construct and was built to accommodate more than 40,000 shoppers daily. 

Beneath the mall was a truck tunnel that was nearly a mile long. In September 1957, the tunnel was designated as a Civil Defense operational headquarters, providing emergency accommodations for over 9,000 people.

The mall opened just as the population of Nassau County, Long Island surged and the area became a major suburban population center. On September 28, 1960, Vice President Richard Nixon, then running for president, made a stop at the Mid Island Shopping Plaza, where he gave a campaign speech. The first addition to the shopping center came in the way of the Fox Plaza North and South Cinerama, which was built as a freestanding structure at the north end of the mall. One of America's earliest "shopping mall" twin-plex theaters, it showed its first feature in May 1964. The shopping center was enclosed in 1968, renamed  Broadway Mall in 1989, renovated between 1987 and 1991, and completely redeveloped in 1995.

Allied Stores planned the center and Gertz, a department store based in Jamaica, Queens, built a five-level store to anchor the facility. The Gertz store was reported to be the tallest suburban department store ever built. Gertz also operated a branded auto-repair facility as a stand-alone building in the parking lot area. In the early 1980s, Gertz closed their Jamaica store, making this location its new flagship store, and the Gertz corporate staff was relocated to the fifth floor of the Broadway Mall location. In mid 1982, Allied merged its Gertz division into its Paramus, New Jersey-based Stern's division. All former Gertz locations were re-branded as Stern's in early 1983, and a regional corporate staff remained at the Broadway Mall store. The store was then rebranded as Macy's in 2001 when Federated Department Stores folded their Stern's Division.

Notable anchor stores in the 1960s-70s were Korvettes (where the present-day IKEA is located) and the Pathmark supermarket on the east wing. "My Pii" was a restaurant on the west end of the mall that featured then-unusual "gourmet" pizza in an atmosphere that featured low light settings and music through a specially designed high-end audio system. "Fly-Buy-Nite," a vendor of higher-end audio equipment, used a retired DC-7 aircraft as a showroom in the southwestern end of the parking lot near a "U.S. General" showroom (precursor to Harbor Freight).

In 1991, IKEA opened its second store in the New York Metropolitan Area at the mall. (The Elizabeth, New Jersey, IKEA store opened in 1990.) Until 2003, the store was not connected to the mall (although only about 20 feet separated the mall from the store). IKEA did, however, maintain a display in the center court where its mall entrance would eventually be. It is currently one of the only IKEA stores that is connected to a mall and has a mall entrance.

In October 1999, a single-level JCPenney opened to the public.  In January 2003, JCPenney closed after four years of operation. It was demolished and replaced by a Target, which opened on October 10, 2004.

In 2005, Vornado Realty Trust purchased Broadway Mall, adding it to its portfolio of shopping centers across the country. Vornado later sold the mall to a partnership led by KKR in 2014 as part of a plan to shelve its regional mall holdings.

On May 5, 2015, renderings surfaced on the homepage of the mall's website that appeared to depict a planned renovation. The renovation of the main mall was completed, while the renovation of the food court is ongoing. New tenants, such as Noodles & Company, Blaze Pizza, Blink Fitness and Chick-Fil-A, were signed.  In 2017, the mall's named was changed from Broadway Mall to Broadway Commons. In July of the same year, a two-level (49,200 square foot) Round One Entertainment opened in space previously housing Steve & Barry's University Sportswear and Sam Goody music.

On January 8, 2020, it was announced Macy's, which maintains several additional outposts nearby, as part of a strategy to focus on their highest achieving locations that they would be leaving the center.

Anchor Stores

Current
IKEA (opened in 1991; originally not part of mall)
Target (opened in 2004)
Blink Fitness
Round 1 Entertainment
H&M
Showcase Cinemas (Opened in 1995)

Former
Gertz (opened in 1956; converted to Stern's in 1982; converted to Macy's in 2001; closed Tuesday, March 17, 2020)
JCPenney (opened October 1999; closed January 5, 2003; demolished in 2004)
Macy's (2001-2020)
Korvettes (site now IKEA)
Steve & Barry's

Restaurants 
Buffalo Wild Wings
On the Border Mexican Grill & Cantina
Panera Bread

Food court

Charley's Grilled Subs 
Chinese Gourmet Express
Hibachi Grill Express
Jerry's New York Pizza
Sushi.com
Subway

References

External links
Official Site

Shopping malls in Nassau County, New York
Shopping malls established in 1956
Shopping malls in the New York metropolitan area
1956 establishments in New York (state)